The 1979 English cricket season was the 80th in which the County Championship had been an official competition. The second Cricket World Cup was played and West Indies defeated England in the final. The County Championship was won by Essex for the first time.

Honours
County Championship - Essex
Gillette Cup - Somerset
Sunday League - Somerset
Benson & Hedges Cup - Essex
Minor Counties Championship - Suffolk
Second XI Championship - Warwickshire II 
Wisden - Joel Garner, Sunil Gavaskar, Graham Gooch, Derek Randall, Brian Rose

World Cup

Test series

India tour

County Championship

Gillette Cup

Benson & Hedges Cup

Sunday League

Leading batsmen

Leading bowlers

References

External links
 CricketArchive – season and tournament itineraries

Annual reviews
 Playfair Cricket Annual 1980
 Wisden Cricketers' Almanack 1980

English cricket seasons in the 20th century
English Cricket Season, 1979
Cricket season